Kelly v Solari (1841) 9 M&W 54, 152 ER 24 is an early common law case, where the principle of unjust enrichment underpinned the decision of the court.

Facts
Mr Solari died. His widow claimed under his life insurance policy as executrix. The insurers later found they were not in fact liable to pay because he had not paid a premium instalment. The policy had been marked lapsed, but the office had not checked.

Judgment
The Court of Exchequer held that the widow was bound to repay. Her lack of fault was irrelevant or that the insurers were careless.

Parke B, said if the money,

Rolfe B said to the fact that Mrs Solari was innocent ‘it cannot be otherwise than unconscientious to retain it.’ (i.e. the money).

Notes

References

1841 in case law
English unjust enrichment case law
1841 in England
Court of Exchequer Chamber cases
1841 in British law